Strange Love is a 2005 reality series featuring Brigitte Nielsen and Flavor Flav.

Strange Love or Strangelove may also refer to:

Film and television
 Dr. Strangelove, a 1964 film by Stanley Kubrick
 "Strange Love" (True Blood), the pilot episode of True Blood
 Strange Love, a 1997 anime adaptation of Hen
Alex Strangelove, a Netflix Original film

Music
 Strangelove (band), an English alternative rock band active 1991–98
 The Strangeloves, an American band active 1964–68
 Strangelove: The Depeche Mode Experience, an American Depeche Mode tribute band
 Strange Love (T.S.O.L. album), a 1990 album by T.S.O.L.
 Strange Love (We the Kings album), a 2015 album by We the Kings

Songs
 "Strange Love" (song), by Mary Wells
 "Strangelove" (song), by Depeche Mode
 "Strange Love", from the Hammer Horror film Lust for a Vampire
 "Strange Love", by Halsey from Badlands
 "Strange Love", by Phixx from Electrophonic Revolution
"Dr. Strangeluv", by Blonde Redhead from 23

Other uses
 Dr Strangelove, a character in the video game Metal Gear Solid: Peace Walker
 Dr Strangelove, radio dramatization by Kerry Shale

See also
 Dr Strangelove syndrome, or Alien hand syndrome